Op de Vrouweheide (English: On the Vrouweheide) is a windmill located on the Vrouwenheide just south of Ubachsberg, Voerendaal, in the Dutch province of Limburg. Built in 1858 as a tower mill, on an artificial hill, the windmill functioned as a gristmill. The mill is a national monument (nr 37893) since 17 January 1967.

History 
Built in 1858, the windmill functioned as a gristmill until 1925, after which it fell into disrepair. The internal machinery was removed in 1950, and in 1958 the exterior was restored to function as a standstill monument. The mill was restored in 1975 to function as a restaurant. It was turned into a living space in 1980. The mill was again restored in 1989 bringing the exterior back to its original state, with the sails in working order. The mill is currently privately owned and functions as housing.

Gallery of images

Trivia 
 Located 216 meters above Amsterdam Ordnance Datum, it is the highest windmill in the Netherlands.
 Although the windmill was built in 1858, the building itself indicates it was built in 1857.

References 

Tower mills in the Netherlands
Grinding mills in the Netherlands
Windmills completed in 1858
Windmills in Limburg (Netherlands)
Rijksmonuments in Limburg
Buildings and structures in Voerendaal